Jonathan Pace Brazee is a retired US Marine infantry colonel and author of speculative fiction, active in the field since 2010, with one story published much earlier in 1979.

Biography
Brazee was born in Oakland, California. He has "lived throughout the US and the world," past homes including Orinda, California, Mexico City, Covina, California, Chestertown, Maryland, Winstead, Connecticut, Des Moines, Iowa, Annapolis, Maryland, Quantico, Virginia, Jacksonville, North Carolina, Camp Schwab, Okinawa, Camp Butler, Okinawa, Lake Ridge, Virginia, Bethesda, Maryland, Poway, California, Baghdad, Iraq, Bangkok, Thailand.

A member of the U.S. Naval Academy Class of 1979, he also attended U.S. International University and the University of California, San Diego, earning a bachelor's, master's, and doctorate. He served in the U.S. military, retiring as a U.S. Marine infantry colonel. He is a member of the U.S. Naval Academy Alumni Association, the Veterans of Foreign Wars, and the Disabled American Veterans.

He now resides with his wife Kiwi and twin girls Danika and Darika in Colorado Springs, Colorado.

Literary career
Brazee's first work of fiction, the short story "Secession," was published in 1978.  His work has since appeared in newspapers, magazines and books. He has been active in the speculative fiction field since 2010, specializing in military science fiction, and has since become a full-time writer.  He is a member of the Science Fiction and Fantasy Writers of America, in which he chairs the professional education committee, and the Romance Writers of America.

He also writes non-fiction on topics including political science, business, military, sports, race relations and personal relations.

Recognition
Brazee is a two-time Nebula Award and one-time Dragon Award finalist, and a USA Today Bestselling writer.

Bibliography

Call to Arms: Capernica
"Conscientious Objector" (2019)
"POG" (2019)
"Veteran" (2019)
Call to Arms: Capernica (2019) (collection)

Ghost Marines
Integration (2018)
Unification (2018)
Devotion (2019)

The Navy of Humankind: Wasp Squadron
Fire Ant (2018)
Crystals (2018)
Ace (2019)
Fortitude (2019)
Indomitable (2020)

The United Federation Universe

The United Federation Marine Corps
Recruit (2014)
Sergeant (2014)
Lieutenant (2014)
Captain (2015)
Major (2015)
Lieutenant Colonel (2015)
Colonel (2015)
Commandant (2015)
The Ryck Lysander Trilogy (2014) (omnibus of first three volumes)
"Rebel (2015)
"High-Value Target" (2016)
"BOLO Mission" (2016)

Women of the United Federation MarinesGladiator (2016)Sniper (2016)Corpsman (2016)Women of the United Federation Marines Trilogy (2016) (omnibus) 
The United Federation Marine Corps' Lysander TwinsLegacy Marines (2016)Esther's Story: Recon Marine (2017)Noah's Story: Marine Tanker (2017)Esther's Story: Special Duty (2017)Blood United (2017)
"Coda" (2017)
The United Federation Marine Corps' Grub WarsAlliance (2017)The Price of Honor (2017)Division of Power (2018)The United Federation Marines Grub Wars Trilogy (2018) (omnibus) 
Other tales in the seriesBehind Enemy Lines (2017)
"Weaponized Math" (2017)Soldier (2018) 

The BOHICA ChroniclesReprobates (with C. J. Fawcett) (2019)Degenerates (with C. J. Fawcett) (2019)Redeemables (with Michael Anderle and C. J. Fawcett) (2019)Thor (with Michael Anderle) (2019)The BOHICA Chronicles Boxed Set: The Complete Series (with Michael Anderle and C. J. Fawcett) (2020) (omnibus)

Vegetable WarsSeeds of War: Invasion (with Lawrence M. Schoen) (2018)
"Seeds of War: Scorched Earth" (with Lawrence M. Schoen) (2018)
"Seeds of War: Bitter Harvest" (with Lawrence M. Schoen) (2018)The Seeds of War Trilogy (with Lawrence M. Schoen) (2018) (collection)

Werewolf of MarinesSemper Lycanus (2014)Patria Lycanus (2015)Pax Lycanus (2016)

Other novelsDarwin's Quest: The Search for the Ultimate Survivor (2010)Wererat (2012)Hannibal (2018) Gemini Twins (2020)

Other collectionsWhere the Battle Rages: Weaponized Math and Other Stories (2020) 

Other short stories
"Secession" (1979)
"Venus: A Paleolithic Short Story" (2014)
"Checkmate" (2018)
"The Bridge" (2019)
"The Lost One" (2019)
"Golden Ticket" (2019)
"Rebel" (2020)
"With Time All Things Revealed" (2020)

Awards
"Weaponized Math" was nominated for the 2018 Nebula Award for Best Novelette. Integration'' was nominated for the 2018 Dragon Award for Best Military Science Fiction or Fantasy Novel. "Fire Ant" was nominated for the 2019 Nebula Award for Best Novella.

References

External links 
 

Living people
21st-century American male writers
American speculative fiction writers
1958 births